The Theodore Roosevelt Bridge (also known as the Teddy Roosevelt Bridge or the Roosevelt Bridge) is a bridge crossing the Potomac River which connects Washington, D.C., with the Commonwealth of Virginia. The bridge crosses over Theodore Roosevelt Island, and carries Interstate 66/U.S. Route 50. The center lane in the bridge is reversible; the middle barrier is moved with a barrier transfer machine. It's operated eastbound during the morning rush hour from 6-11 am. The bridge is named in honor of Theodore Roosevelt, the 26th President of the United States.

History 

Plans for a new bridge across the Potomac River began circulating in the early 1950s. A bridge was first proposed (across Theodore Roosevelt Island, as it happened) in 1952, although at that time the bridge was to have linked with the E Street Expressway. The Theodore Roosevelt Memorial Association (later renamed the Theodore Roosevelt Association, or TRA), which owned the island vigorously opposed any bridge across its land. In July 1954, various government agencies and members of Congress came together to propose a bridge connecting to Constitution Avenue NW (although debate continued and numerous unsuccessful proposals were made to move the bridge to other locations over the next four years). Less clear was where the bridge would land on the Virginia side of the river.  Five locations for the crossing were considered. In order of preference, they were: 1) South of Little Island, 2) Over the northern end of Theodore Roosevelt Island, 3) Over Little Island, 4) Over the center of Theodore Roosevelt Island, and 5) Over the southern end of Theodore Roosevelt Island.

TRA president Frank Ross McCoy, a vocal opponent of the bridge, died in 1954, weakening the TRA's bargaining position.  In July 1955, the association agreed to allow the federal government to use the southern end of Theodore Roosevelt Island. The United States Commission of Fine Arts approved a steel bridge design in December 1955.

President Dwight Eisenhower signed legislation authorizing the bridge on June 4, 1958.  This legislation designated the bridge for the first time as the "Theodore Roosevelt Bridge". Construction of the bridge began in 1960, and it opened on June 23, 1964.

Rehabilitation
Theodore Roosevelt Bridge underwent minor rehabilitation work overseen by the District of Columbia Department of Transportation (DDOT) in 2013. After this work, DDOT inspected the bridge in 2014 and discovered additional need for repair. Due to heavy funding needs to replace or repair other bridges in the city, DDOT pushed the date for these repairs to 2021.

As of June 2022, emergency work on the bridge is expected to be finished in the summer of 2022. A full rehabilitation of the bridge is expected to begin in 2024 at the earliest.

See also
 
 
 
 
 List of crossings of the Potomac River

References

Roosevelt, Theodore Bridge
Bridges completed in 1964
U.S. Route 50
Bridges over the Potomac River
Buildings and structures in Arlington County, Virginia
Transportation in Arlington County, Virginia
Road bridges in Washington, D.C.
Road bridges in Virginia
Interstate 66
Bridges on the Interstate Highway System
Bridges of the United States Numbered Highway System
Roads with a reversible lane
Steel bridges in the United States
Girder bridges in the United States
1964 establishments in Virginia
1964 establishments in Washington, D.C.